Hugh ("Hughie") Cochrane (9 February 1943 – 17 August 2020) was a Scottish professional footballer who played as an inside forward. Born in Glasgow, he played junior football for Dennistoun Waverley before signing for Dundee United in 1961. He was released in 1963 without having appeared in the first team. He signed for Barnsley in August 1963, making five Football League appearances. After leaving Barnsley, Cochrane played non-League football for Wimbledon, Ashford Town, Margate, Romford, Ramsgate and as player and manager at Wombwell Sporting Association.

References

Scottish footballers
1943 births
2020 deaths
Footballers from Glasgow
Dundee United F.C. players
Barnsley F.C. players
Wimbledon F.C. players
Ashford United F.C. players
Margate F.C. players
Romford F.C. players
Ramsgate F.C. players
Wombwell Town F.C. (1940s) players
English Football League players
Scottish Junior Football Association players
Association football inside forwards